"I Am One" is the debut single by American alternative rock band the Smashing Pumpkins. It was the band's first ever release and remains the only single issued by the band with co-writing credits to both Billy Corgan and James Iha. It charted on the UK Singles Chart at a peak position of number 73.

Two recordings of the song were released. One was recorded in 1990 and was the Pumpkins' first release and first on Limited Potential. This recording was financed with the money from Corgan's college tuition fund left by his grandmother. "I Am One" was re-recorded for Gish and a new single was released on Caroline Records and Hut Recordings. Corgan later stated his regret with not re-working the song for Gish, as the two versions are nearly identical. A video for the song was also filmed, but never released (until 2001) due to the band being unhappy with the result. Footage from the video was instead used on the long form video, Vieuphoria, the long version of the music video was released on the Greatest Hits Video Collection.

With only 1500 copies pressed, the release is highly sought after by collectors. There are apparently three test pressings also in existence, two owned by Billy Corgan and one was formally owned by Limited Potential owner, Mike Potential.

"I Am One" features a doubled guitar solo – a technique later used on Pumpkins songs like "Ava Adore", "Tarantula", and "Bring the Light".

The music video features a live performance by the band.

Performance 

In live performance (starting around the release of Siamese Dream) Corgan would often improvise a speech during the extended bass break; as a result the song could extend to 8–10 minutes in length. The speech section is known among fans as "the I Am One rant". These rants were criticized, sometimes even by the other band members, due to their abrasive nature. Jimmy Chamberlin considered these rants to be "art-breakdown". The rants were apparently based around the erosion of the belief structure in America's youth, and Corgan has stated they were the gestation for many ideas he later explored on Mellon Collie and the Infinite Sadness. Some of the rants contained lyrics for future songs, most notably "Zero". The recording of "I Am One" on Vieuphoria / Earphoria features one such rant. When the band released their greatest hits compilation, Rotten Apples, in 2001, "I Am One" was one of the few singles that did not make the cut (the others were "Tristessa", "Rocket", "Thirty-Three", "The End Is the Beginning Is the End", and on American copies of the album, "Try, Try, Try").

Track listing

Single personnel

The Smashing Pumpkins 

 Billy Corgan – vocals, guitar, production
 James Iha (as "James" on Limited Potential) – guitar, photography (Gish version)
 D'arcy Wretzky – bass guitar
 Jimmy Chamberlin – drums

Technical personnel 

 Kerry Brown – production, CD single b-sides
 Butch Vig – production, Gish version
 Lynne Fischer – design, photography (Limited Potential)

References

External links 
 
 Music video

1990 debut singles
The Smashing Pumpkins songs
1992 singles
Songs written by James Iha
Songs written by Billy Corgan
Song recordings produced by Billy Corgan
Song recordings produced by Butch Vig
Virgin Records singles
Music videos directed by Kevin Kerslake
1990 songs